George Edward "Three Finger" Brice (April 22, 1888 – September 3, 1962) was an American Negro league pitcher in the 1910s.

A native of Harford County, Maryland, Brice attended Howard University and played for the Cuban Giants in 1914. He died in Petersburg, Virginia in 1962 at age 74.

References

External links
Baseball statistics and player information from Baseball-Reference Black Baseball Stats and Seamheads

1888 births
1962 deaths
Cuban Giants players
20th-century African-American people